Ondřej Uherka (born 24 September 1991 in Uherské Hradiště) is a Czech professional squash player. As of February 2018, he was ranked number 133 in the world. He is in the Czech Republic men's national squash team.

References

1991 births
Living people
Czech male squash players
People from Uherské Hradiště
Sportspeople from the Zlín Region